"Remember Me" is a song recorded by English singer Cliff Richard and released in October 1987 as the third single from his Always Guaranteed album. The song reached number 35 in the UK Singles Chart and the top 20 in Germany and Ireland.

The song was written by Alan Tarney who had previously written some of Richard's most successful tracks since his 1976 renaissance, including "We Don't Talk Anymore", "Dreamin'", "A Little in Love" and "Wired for Sound".

A live version of the song was released on the re-release of Richard's From a Distance: The Event album in 2005.

Track listing
UK 7" Single (EM 31)
"Remember Me"
"Another Christmas Day"

UK 12" Single (12EM 31)
"Remember Me" (Extended Version)
"Another Christmas Day"
"Brave New World"

UK CD single (CDEM 31)
"Remember Me"
"Some People"
"Another Christmas Day"
"Remember Me" (Extended Version)

Chart performance

References

External links
  "Remember Me" at Cliff Richard Songs database

1987 singles
1987 songs
Cliff Richard songs
Songs written by Alan Tarney
Song recordings produced by Alan Tarney